Africans in Guangzhou (more colloquially ) are African immigrants and African Chinese residents of Guangzhou, China.

Beginning during the late 1990s economic boom, an influx of thousands of African traders and business people, predominantly from West Africa, arrived in Guangzhou and created an African community in the middle of the southern Chinese metropolis. In 2012, it was estimated that there were more than 100,000 Africans living in Guangzhou, but most of them stayed for a very short time. Since 2014, the city's African population has significantly declined due to strict immigration enforcement by Chinese authorities and economic pressures in home countries including depreciation of the Nigerian naira and Angolan kwanza.

Population

Most of the hundreds of thousands of Africans who arrive in Guangzhou are short term visitors making a purchasing run, making population figures liquid and difficult to estimate. According to official figures, 430,000 arrivals and exits by nationals from African countries were recorded at the city's checkpoints in the first nine months of 2014. Guangzhou officials released official population figures for residents in 2014 due to popular fears of an Ebola outbreak in the city by way of the African community. According to the city, there were 16,000 Africans including North Africans residing in Guangzhou. Of these residents, 4,000 were long-term residents, which is defined by city officials as living for longer than 6 months in the city.

A 2014 article in the magazine This Is Africa noted a decrease in population, blaming increased immigration enforcement and foreign exchange difficulties. A September 2016 CNN article on the community claimed that upwards to thousands of African residents had left the city in the previous 18 months. From 2014, the African population significantly declined, dropping to 10,344 residents by February 2017.

Among African nationalities in Guangzhou, the two countries with by far the most people are the West African nations of Nigeria and Mali. Nigerian people, mostly of the Igbo ethnicity, are most represented among those residing while Malians according to city records are most numerous among long-term residents.  Migrants from the Democratic Republic of Congo, Ghana, and Senegal are the remaining African communities in Guangzhou with at least a few hundred registered members at country-based civic organizations in 2014.

By 2020, there are an estimated 500,000 Africans living in China, with the majority residing in Guangzhou.

Neighborhoods
There are two main areas where Africans live and do business in Guangzhou: Xiaobei and Guangyuanxi, both areas in the centrally located Yuexiu District.

The area of Xiaobei is near Xiaobei station and home to several streets catering to African and Middle Eastern residents. Since the area was home to an existing Muslim population from Ningxia and Xinjiang, many African immigrants, around half of whom are Muslims, congregated around one area of town primarily because of the convenience in finding halal food. Owing to the neighborhood's history there are slightly more Muslim Africans than Christian Africans in Xiaobei. The nerve center of the area is Baohan Straight Street where there are African orientated shops and restaurants. The street was repaved in 2015 and many of the hawkers have departed or set up shops.

About  from Xiaobei and north of the Guangzhou railway station is Guangyuanxi, a more business orientated area with a major presence of Nigerian Igbo people. The area is filled with large trademarts selling shoes, clothing, and other goods. The trademarts are housed in large buildings called Tong Tong Trade Mart, Tian'en Clothing Market, Tangqi Building, Canaan Market, and Ying Fu Building. Since stricter immigration enforcement in the summer of 2013, this area has become much more dormant than before.

History

1990s and 2000s
Since China's economic boom in the 1990s, thousands of Africans migrated to China; most of these migrants were from West Africa. Many Africans left Indonesia and Thailand and went to Guangzhou after the 1997 Asian financial crisis, and the economic opportunity attracted more.

In Guangzhou, Africans are generally engaged in commerce, visiting or residing in the city because of its wholesale trading markets supplied by nearby factories. During the 2000s, the city's African population rapidly increased with a 2008 news report stating the number of African residents had increased by 30% to 40% annually.

Riots in 2009 and 2012
Conflict between the African community and police in Guangzhou resulted in riots in 2009 and 2012. In July 2009, two Nigerian men jumped several floors from a building in an attempt to flee Chinese immigration authorities. Both men were hurt from the fall. But on hearing rumors of their deaths, hundreds of Africans, mostly Nigerian, surrounded a local police station. The demonstration escalated into a riot that shut down eight lanes of traffic on a major thoroughfare for several hours.

In June 2012, an African held in police custody after a taxi fare dispute died after according to police "suddenly losing consciousness". Over a hundred Africans gathered at the police station in question demanding to know the cause of death. Guangzhou police responded with a statement that they would "investigate and settle this case strictly by law" and also that "All should abide by the law of China; no one should harm public interests or damage public order."

Stricter immigration enforcement
A large scale immigration enforcement sweep was conducted by local police in July and August 2013. Media reports have reported a decline in the local African population since 2014 with stricter immigration cited as one of the reasons.

The system of immigration that had been in place since 2013 in Yuexiu District appeared to undergo change in summer 2018 with media reports that several low cost hotels and apartments in the area had prohibited African guests or singled out passport holders from Uganda and Nigeria, and shops and restaurants catering to Africans had been closed. The Uganda daily Daily Monitor spoke to Ugandans in Guangzhou who reported being advised to stay in more costly 4 or 5 star hotels, and other sources for the newspaper claimed the crackdown targeting Ugandans had followed an increasing number of criminal suspects in China charged with drug trafficking holding Ugandan passports, with the suspects allegedly being Nigerian citizens that obtained Ugandan passports through bribing "rogue" Ugandan immigration officials. A newspaper source described as a "senior government official" in Uganda blamed the Ministry of Internal Affairs for illegally selling Ugandan passports. A spokesperson for the Directorate of Citizenship and Immigration Control, under the Ministry of Internal Affairs, responded that the Uganda passports were stolen or sold by Ugandan individuals.

COVID-19 pandemic

During the COVID-19 pandemic in mainland China, reports became widespread of Africans of Guangzhou being evicted from flats and hotels by landlords, and having difficulty in finding food and shelter as a result. Some became homeless and had to sleep on the street.

On 11 April, the United States Consulate General in Guangzhou warned African-Americans to avoid travel to the Guangzhou city, with a report by some African-Americans that "some businesses and hotels refuse to do business with them". The Consulate further raised a travel warning to announce the discrimination condition against African-Americans in Guangzhou on 13 April. In that warning, it said that Chinese officials might require Africans to participate in the COVID-19 test and undergo a 14-day supervised quarantine at their own expense.

Ambassadors in China from many African countries wrote to Foreign Minister of the People's Republic of China, Wang Yi, for asking China to resolve the discrimination problem against Africans in Guangzhou. The chair of African Union Commission, Moussa Faki Mahamat, also summoned Chinese Ambassador to the AU, Liu Yuxi, to express his extreme concern.

On 12 April, Zhao Lijian, the spokesperson of Ministry of Foreign Affairs of the People's Republic of China, said that:

He also said in the regular press conference on 13 April that China will address the "African friends’ concerns" by adopting a series of measures to avoid racist and discrimination problems, and condemned "the US had better focus on domestic efforts to contain the spread of the virus. Attempts to use the pandemic to drive a wedge between China and Africa are bound to fail".

Immigration issues

Some Africans have applied for permanent residency or work permits, but they are the minority. Many are traders on tourist visas engaged in import-export between China and Africa.

According to Reuters in 2009, there were as many as 100,000 Africans and Arabs in Guangzhou, mostly illegal visa overstayers. Some Africans say that overstaying in China is inevitable because it is impossible to finish off the business they had come for within a 30-day time frame and they cannot afford a plane ticket home. Sociologists Gordon Mathews, Linessa Dan Lin, Yang Yang noted in a study of the local African community that Nigerians, particularly Igbos, are much more likely than other African groups to stay illegally due to "masculine pride". Based on field interviews, Igbos report being under greater pressure from family and peers to become a success to justify a trip to China.

Since 2004 at the latest, illegal immigration has increasingly come into the focus of the police authorities in Guangzhou and later throughout the country. In 2003, campaigns against illegal immigration were conducted in Guangdong and other Chinese provinces, and around 2008, the police repeatedly conducted so-called "hurricane" campaigns against illegal immigration in Guangdong.

Intermarriage
By 2014, there have been multiple marriages between African and Chinese people in Guangzhou, with almost all marriages being between African men and Chinese women. Chinese marriage visas do not legally allow the spouse to work. Many marriages have stability issues due to the difficulties in keeping visas. The majority of the Chinese who live and marry Africans in Guangzhou, for example, come from the rural poorer provinces Sichuan, Hunan, Hubei. As of 2010/2014, rural Chinese who marry Africans and foreigners are allowed to have numerous or multiple children compared with the average Chinese citizens.

Foreign exchange difficulties
In addition to immigration enforcement, another difficulty to navigate for African traders has been the depreciation of several African currencies after the fall in oil prices since 2014. Nigerian traders who are a large part of the African contingent reported being stymied by the difficulty of obtaining foreign currency in Nigeria needed to purchase goods. The Nigerian government had initially reacted to the sharp depreciation in the Nigerian naira by limiting access to foreign exchange and refusing to devalue the official exchange rate. In order to obtain naira, Nigerian traders had to resort to the black market to buy dollars at a 75% premium, making it difficult to turn a profit. The foreign exchange problem proved so discouraging that one long time Nigerian clothing trader in Guangzhou interviewed by the Financial Times reported being unable to fill a single container so far into the year in the middle of 2016. Difficulties were reported by traders with foreign exchange in other African countries including Angola, another top oil producer.

Crime
There has been a recent growth of drug trafficking among groups of foreigners from around the world, including Africa. A Nigerian consulate official in Guangzhou estimated in 2017 that on average 1% of Nigerians arriving in Guangzhou would be arrested for a drug-related offense.

The Guangzhou Public Security Bureau carried out a major drug bust with 1,300 police officers raiding the Lihua Hotel (Dragon Hotel) in the city's Yuexiu District. The August 2013 raid coincided with an immigration enforcement crackdown in the summer 2013 and led to the arrest of 168 suspects, most of whom were described by police as citizens of Nigeria and Mali. The then Nigerian Ambassador in Beijing, Sola Onadipe, stated that more than 50 of the suspects arrested were holders of Nigerian passports. He noted large amounts of money were found on the suspects and lamented in an interview with the Vanguard, "As an embassy, how do you tackle such a thing?" The Ambassador in the same interview, a year before planned retirement, was harsh on his countrymen for engaging in what he described as rampant drug trafficking and ill-mannered public behavior ("smoking marijuana openly in another man's country") and vented "it makes you not to enjoy your job". Ambassador Onadipe gave the local police credit for fairly adjudicating criminal cases involving Nigerians and pointed out that other African communities in Guangzhou including the neighboring countries of Ivory Coast and Ghana and countries across Francophone Africa didn't get the same level of police attention as Nigerians.

See also

Africans in Hong Kong
Racism in the People's Republic of China
Chinese people in Nigeria

References

Further reading


 
 ——来自基层的调研报道（之一）
 ——来自基层的调研报道（之二）
 ——来自基层的调研报道（之三）
 

Africa–China relations
Guangzhou

People from Guangzhou
Ethnic groups in China
Immigration to China
Guangzhou
Racism in China
Human rights in China